Center Place Restoration School is a private K-12 in Independence, Missouri, in the Kansas City metropolitan area. Opened in 1991, the school is associated with the Restoration Branches movement formed in the 1980s by members of the Reorganized Church of Jesus Christ of Latter Day Saints (RLDS, now the Community of Christ).

References

External links
 Center Place Restoration School

1991 establishments in Missouri
Buildings and structures in Independence, Missouri
Educational institutions established in 1991
Private elementary schools in Missouri
Private middle schools in Missouri
Private high schools in Missouri
Schools in Jackson County, Missouri